The Daegu International Marathon is an annual marathon race which takes place in April in Daegu, South Korea. The day's events also feature a 5K event and a 10K event, as well as the full course marathon (42.195 km).

The race begins and ends at the Daegu Stadium. A comparatively fast course, it hosted the World Championships Marathon in September 2011.

The 2020 edition of the race was cancelled due to the coronavirus pandemic, with all runners qualifying for a full refund.

Past winners
Key:

References

External links
Official website
marathoninfo

Athletics in South Korea
Marathons in South Korea
Recurring sporting events established in 2009
Spring (season) events in South Korea